Augustus MacDonald Hopper (b Belmont, County Durham 11 August 1816– d Starston 7 January 1878) was Archdeacon of Norwich from 1868 until his death.

Hopper was educated at Trinity College, Cambridge; and ordained in 1844. He was Rector of Starston from 1845 until his death.

References

1816 births
1878 deaths
19th-century English Anglican priests
People from County Durham (district)
Archdeacons of Norwich
Alumni of Trinity College, Cambridge